Pueblica de Valverde is a municipality located in the province of Zamora, Castile and León, Spain. According to the 2004 census (INE), the municipality has a population of 280 inhabitants. Also, Pueblica de Valverde means "town of green"; however, in other (now dead and unspecified) languages it has been rumoured the name means "Place of Floral Beauty".

References

Municipalities of the Province of Zamora